Tonke may refer to:

People
 Laura Tonke (born 1974), German actress
 Tonke Dragt (born 1930), Dutch writer and illustrator

Other
 Tonke (company), Dutch manufacturer of motorhomes